Erreà is an Italian sports equipment company supplier. Erreà was the first Italian sportswear company to be accredited with the Oeko-tex standard certification, which assures that garments textiles are free from harmful chemicals.

Background
Established in 1988, Erreà's world headquarters are in San Polo di Torrile, just outside Parma. It was founded by Angelo Gandolfi, who remains president today.

Erreà entered the English football market in 1994, signing a deal with then Premier League side Middlesbrough that lasted for many years. Erreà were the kit manufacturer for Burnley Football Club from the 2005/06 championship season through to their first promotion to the Premier League in 2009/10. The company also signed a deal to supply Norwich City with equipment in 2011.

It celebrated its 25th anniversary in 2013 with the presentation of its key footballing clients' shirts for the next season. Parma, Atalanta, Norwich City, Brighton, Blackpool, Rayo Vallecano, Numancia, Alcorcón, ADO Den Haag and Nantes were the teams represented.

Sponsorship teams

Basketball

National teams

Clubs teams

Football

National teams 

 

 

  
 
 (From 2023)
 (From 2023)
 
 
 

 (From 2023)

Non-national representative teams 

  (From 2022)
 (From 2022)

Associations 
Erreà  is also the official supplier for the following leagues and associations:

 CONIFA  (From 2022)
  Gabon Championnat National
  Serie C
  Orange Pro League

Club teams

Gymnastic

National teams

Rugby Union 
 Benetton
 USA Perpignan

Rugby League

National teams

Club teams 
 Wigan Warriors
 London Broncos
 Hunslet
 London Skolars
 Dewsbury Rams
 Swinton Lions
 York City Knights
 Toulouse Olympique

Volleyball

National teams 
  Men / Women  (From 2022)
  Men / Women
  Men / Women
  Men / Women
  Men
  Men / Women
  Men / Women
  Men / Women
  Men / Women
  Men / Women
  Men/ Women
  Men / Women
  Men / Women
  Men / Women
  Men / Women
  Men 
  Men

Club teams 
 Oudegem  (From 2022/23 season)
 RC Cannes
 Chaumont Volley-Ball 52
 Le Plessis-Robinson Volley-ball
 Montpellier Hérault Sport Club Volley-Ball
 Terville Florange Olympique Club
 Tourcoing Lille Métropole Volley-Ball
 Tours Volley-Ballf
 Pays d'Aix Venelles Volley-Ball
 Savallese Millenium Brescia
 Fenera Chieri
 Megabox Vallefoglia
 myCicero Volley Pesaro
 Savino Del Bene Scandicci
 MKS Slepsk Malow Suwalki
 VC Uralochka-NTMK
 OK Maribor
 SC Prometey

Charities 
 Fratelli Tutti

Television 
 Champs vs. Stars Season 3

Archery

National teams 
  Australia
  Italy

Baseball

Cycling

See also

 
Sergio Tacchini

References

External links

 

Shoe brands
Companies established in 1988
Sporting goods manufacturers of Italy
Shoe companies of Italy
Sportswear brands
Italian brands
Italian companies established in 1988
Companies based in Emilia-Romagna